The Agassiz Ice Cap formerly Agassiz Glacier is an ice cap on the central eastern side of Ellesmere Island, Nunavut, Canada. It is located between the North Ellesmere ice field to the north and the Prince of Wales Icefield to the south.

Environmental studies 
Several studies have been conducted which involve the analysis of ice cores extracted from the Agassiz Ice cap. Many of these studies are focused around climate change.

References

Bodies of ice of Qikiqtaaluk Region
Ellesmere Island
Arctic Cordillera
Ice caps of Canada